Yunusemreia is a genus of moths belonging to the subfamily Olethreutinae of the family Tortricidae.

Species
Yunusemreia triangulum (Diakonoff, 1970)

See also
List of Tortricidae genera

References

External links
Tortricid.net

Tortricidae genera
Olethreutinae